Hammarbyhöjden metro station is on the green line of the Stockholm metro, located in Hammarbyhöjden, Söderort. The station was inaugurated on 17 April 1958 as the east terminus of a one-station extension from Skärmarbrink. On 18 November 1958 an extension to Bagarmossen was opened.

The station is located above ground and has two entrances. The north entrance is located near Finn Malmgrens Plan. The south entrance is accessed from Ulricehamnsvägen.

The decoration of the station is the smallest of the metro system: A 30x40 cm brick embossment depicting a goat.

References

Green line (Stockholm metro) stations
Railway stations opened in 1958